Carohamilia is a neotropical genus of moths in the family Cossidae.

Species
 Carohamilia lineaplena (Dognin, 1911)
 Carohamilia ophelia (Schaus, 1921)

Former species
 Carohamilia itys (Druce, 1911)

References

External links
Natural History Museum Lepidoptera generic names catalog

Zeuzerinae
Cossidae genera